Aghuzbon (also Romanized as Āghūzbon) is a village in Tutaki Rural District, in the Central District of Siahkal County, Gilan Province, Iran. At the 2006 census, its population was 38, in 13 families.

References 

Populated places in Siahkal County